Broadway is a  road in inner city Sydney, New South Wales, Australia. The road constitutes the border between the suburbs of Ultimo (to the north) and Chippendale (to the south). Broadway is also an urban locality.

Broadway connects the south end of George Street where it terminates at the junction with Harris and Regent streets, and runs west to the junction of Parramatta Road and City Road at Victoria Park. Broadway and Parramatta Road are part of the Great Western Highway.

History

Broadway is historically important because it is one of the first roads built in the colony of New South Wales, in 1794. It had been called "George Street South" and then "George Street West". After being widened in 1906 when the Central railway station was built, George Street west of Railway Square, it became known as "The Broadway". This name was subsequently shortened to just "Broadway".

In the early nineteenth century, travel to Parramatta on Parramatta Road attracted a toll and this was charged from the area now known as Railway Square. The toll gate was subsequently moved to the approximate junction of the present Broadway and Parramatta Road.

St Benedict's Church on Parramatta Road (now incorporated into the University of Notre Dame campus) is the oldest consecrated Catholic Church in Australia. It was the parish church of Norman Gilroy, the first Australian to become a cardinal.

Broadway was once a major retailing centre, and for 90 years was home to the flagship complex of department store chain Grace Brothers. The complex consisted of two stores on either side of Bay Street. It was visited by Queen Elizabeth II during her 1954 visit to Australia. Retailing on Broadway declined and the store was eventually closed in 1995. Today this site contains the Broadway Shopping Centre on the western side and the UniLodge on Broadway on the eastern side.

The southern side of the road was dominated by the Carlton & United brewery. The brewery closed in December 2006 and the site was sold on 29 June 2007. Located opposite the University of Technology Sydney, One Central Park is an apartment complex with a shopping centre called Central located on the lower levels.

Transport
Broadway was a busy tram thoroughfare in the first half of the 20th century, until the line's closure in 1958. Since then it has been the primary entry point into the central business district for bus services from the Inner West currently operated by Transit Systems..

Education
A number of educational institutions are located on or around Broadway. These include the International Grammar School (IGS), University of Technology, Sydney (UTS), University of Notre Dame, University of Sydney and the Sydney Institute of TAFE.

UTS has a particularly strong presence. The UTS Tower is the tallest structure on Broadway and is a Sydney landmark. Designed in the brutalist style, it has been described as one of Sydney's ugliest buildings. An adjacent building on Broadway designed by Denton Corker Marshall was completed in 2014. There are also plans to redesign the podium of the tower.

Other buildings

In popular culture
Part of the video for singer David Bowie's 1983 single "Let's Dance", took place on Broadway in front of the University of Notre Dame Australia.

See also

References

External links
  [CC-By-SA]

Sydney localities
Streets in Sydney